The Official Vinyl Singles Chart is a weekly record chart compiled by the Official Charts Company (OCC) on behalf of the music industry in the United Kingdom since April 2015. It lists the 40 most popular singles in the gramophone record (or "vinyl") format. This is a list of the singles which reached number one on the Official Vinyl Singles Chart in the 2010s.

Number ones

By record label
19 record labels have topped the chart for at least three weeks.

By artist
18 artists topped the chart for at least three weeks.

Notes

References

External links
Official Vinyl Singles Chart Top 40 at the Official Charts Company

Vinyl